Anne Zohra Berrached (born 31 July 1982 in Erfurt) is a German film director and screenwriter.

Life and career 
The daughter of an Algerian father, Anne Zohra Berrached was born and raised in the GDR. Following specialized secondary school in art, she earned a university degree in social pedagogy. Anne Zohra Berrached worked for two years in London as a drama teacher before spending one year abroad in Cameroon and Spain.

In the year of 2009, Anne Zohra Berrached directed her debut short movie Der Pausenclown (The Class Clown) about a Lebanese neighbour and comedian who lived in Berlin-Neukölln. Later the movie was broadcast on the German television network WDR. In the same year, after an unsuccessful attempt to get in to Film University Potsdam, Anne Zohra Berrached started her education at one of the most famous film universities of Germany, Filmacademy Baden-Wurttemberg in Ludwigsburg.

Her first feature-length film Zwei Mütter (Two Mothers) is about a lesbian couple who audition men to collect their sperm for having a child. With Two Mothers, Anne Zohra Berrached received the main award of the section Perspective German Cinema at the 63rd Berlinale.

In February 2016 Anne Zohra Berrached presented her second film, 24 Wochen (24 Weeks), at competition of the 66th Berlinale. The movie is about a pregnant comedian (Julia Jentsch) and her husbands (Bjarne Mädel) decision over a legal abortion for their unborn child diagnosed with down syndrome. This was the first breach of the topic of legal late term abortion in cinema and was considered taboo for over 90% of women in Germany facing a similar situation.

24 Weeks was her final degree project before she graduated from film school. As being the only German film in competition, 24 Weeks received the award of Guild German Filmartist (Gilde Deutscher Filmkunsttheater) for best picture. 24 Weeks was also honoured with the Silver Lola of Best German Film 2017 at the German Film Awards.

In 2021 alongside M. Night Shyamalan and Connie Nielson, Berrached was appointed to the international jury of the main competition at Berlinale and 2018 appointed in the international jury of the 53rd Chicago Film Festival. 

Her third feature film, Die Welt wird eine andere sein (international title: Copilot), was funded in part by the coveted Arte Grand Accord grant. The movie were shot in the U.S. state Florida and Lebanon. In 2021, she received an invitation to the Panorama section of the Berlinale. The relationship drama is based on the biography of Lebanese terrorist Ziad Jarrah. With an estimated budget of six million euros, the film was the largest feature Berrached has directed to date, winning the first prize in the Feature Film Competition and the Popular Jury of the prestigious Italian Lucca Film Festival and Europa Cinema.

Berrached directed a total of three episodes of the ARD television crime series Tatort. Tatort: Der Fall Holdt reached an audience of 10.22 million viewers when it was first broadcast in 2017.

Berrached has taught directing workshops for the Goethe-Institut in Cairo, several ones in Mexico for the Festival International de Cine de Guadalajara, and in Germany at the Filmakademie BW.

She lives and works in Berlin.

Filmography 
 2011: E. + U. (Shortfilm) – Director
 2012: Saint&Whore (Documentary) – Director, Screenplay
 2012: Hunde wie wir (medium length movie) – Director
 2013: Die rechte Hand (medium length movie) – Director
 2013: Two mothers – Director, Screenplay
 2016: 24 Weeks – Director, Screenplay
 2017: Millennials – Actress
 2017: Tatort: Der Fall Holdt - Director
 2021: Die Welt wird eine andere sein / Copilot – Regie, Drehbuch
 2021: Tatort: Das kalte Haus – Director, Screenplay
 2022: Tatort: Liebeswut – Director

Awards 
 2012: ProSiebenSat1 Prime Time Prize, Screenplay Award - Mars Venus Venus Mars
 2013: 63rd Berlinale, Directing Award of the section "Dialogue en Perspective" of the Berlinale Perspektive Deutsches Kino - Two Mothers
 2013: Best Documentary Film, Fetish Film Festival - Holy and Whore
 2013: First Steps No Fear Award - Two Mothers
 2013: Studio Hamburg Young Talent Award: Nomination - Two Mothers
 2014: Caligari Promotional Award - 24 Weeks
 2016: Best Film in Competition, 66th Berlinale, GUILDE Film Award - 24 Weeks
 2016: Best Screenplay, Filmkunstfest Mecklenburg-Vorpommern - 24 weeks
 2016: Best Production Design, Neisse Film Festival - 24 weeks
 2016: Audience Award, Filmkunstfest Mecklenburg-Vorpommern - 24 weeks
 2016: Best Director, Filmkunstfest Mecklenburg-Vorpommern - 24 weeks
 2016: Best Director, 27th Filmfest Emden Norderney - 24 weeks
 2016: Studio Hamburg Young Talent Award, Best Director and Best Production - 24 weeks[5]
 2016: Saarland Medien GmbH Award of the Günter Rohrbach Film Prize for 24 Weeks.
 2017: German Film Award 2017 Lola in Silver for 24 Weeks
 2017: DEFA Foundation Award for Young Cinema for Anne Zohra Berrached
 2020: Grand Prize, Feature Film Competition Lucca Film Festival - Die Welt wird eine andere sein (international title: Copilot)
 2020: Main Award, Popular Jury of Lucca Film Festival - Die Welt wird eine andere sein (international title: Copilot)
 2020: Best Director, Student Jury, Lucca Film Festival - Die Welt wird eine andere sein (international title: Copilot)
 2022: Nomination, Best Director, DafFNE 2022

References

External links 
 Anne Zohra Berrached at filmportal.de
 Profil at abovetheline.de
 Anne Zohra Berrached at Internet Movie Database (English)

German women film directors
German women screenwriters
German screenwriters
Living people
1982 births
Mass media people from Erfurt
Film people from Thuringia